The Farglory THE ONE is a skyscraper located in Cianjhen District, Kaohsiung, Taiwan. It is the fourth tallest building in Taiwan and the second tallest in Kaohsiung. The height of building is 267.6 m, the floor area is 166,415.76m2, and it comprises 68 floors above ground, as well as 7 basement levels. It was completed at the end of 2019.

Gallery

See also 
 Taipei 101
 Shin Kong Life Tower
 85 Sky Tower
 List of tallest buildings in Kaohsiung
 List of tallest buildings in Taiwan

References 

Skyscrapers in Kaohsiung
Skyscraper hotels in Kaohsiung
Residential skyscrapers in Taiwan
Hotel buildings completed in 2020
2020 establishments in Taiwan